John Thomas Connor (21 December 1919 – 5 December 1998) was an English professional footballer who played as a centre forward.

Career
Born in Todmorden, Connor played for Albion Rovers, Ipswich Town, Carlisle United, Ards, Rochdale, Bradford City, Stockport County, Crewe Alexandra and Runcorn.

He joined Ipswich Town in November 1944, and left in December 1946. For them he made 12 appearances in the Football League, scoring 4 goals; he also made one Cup appearance.

He joined Bradford City in April 1951, and left in October 1951. For them he made 14 appearances in the Football League, scoring 7 goals.

Personal life
His son Jim and grandson Joe also played for Stockport County.

Sources

References

1919 births
1998 deaths
English footballers
Albion Rovers F.C. players
Ipswich Town F.C. players
Carlisle United F.C. players
Ards F.C. players
Rochdale A.F.C. players
Bradford City A.F.C. players
Stockport County F.C. players
Crewe Alexandra F.C. players
Runcorn F.C. Halton players
English Football League players
Association football forwards